Grumiana is a genus of butterflies in the family Lycaenidae erected by Alexander Borisovich Zhdanko in 2004. It is monotypic, containing only the species Grumiana berezowskii first described by Grigory Grum-Grshimailo in 1902. It is found in Sichuan, China.

References

Polyommatini
Monotypic butterfly genera
Lycaenidae genera